Acaulospora rehmii is a species of fungus in the family Acaulosporaceae. It forms arbuscular mycorrhiza and vesicles in roots. Isolated from the soil of a cultivated field in Colombia, the fungus was described as new to science in 1987.

References

External links

Diversisporales
Fungi of Colombia
Fungi described in 1987